The Lone Star Mustangs are a team of the Women's Football Alliance.  Based in Bedford Texas (part of the Dallas-Fort Worth Metroplex), the Mustangs play their home games at Pennington Field (the campus was formerly M.B. Smiley High School).

History
The Lone Star Mustangs played their first full season of women's full contact football in 2009 and ended the season at 6-2 after playing the H-Town Texas Cyclones and the Austin Outlaws and missed the playoffs by merely 1 point. In 2010, the second full season of play for the Mustangs, they won the Women's Football Alliance National Championship.

In 2009, the Mustangs were proud to have first team Women's Football Alliance All-Americans Ebony Jones at defensive end and Alex Harvey at defensive tackle. The Mustangs also had 3 honorable mention Women's Football Alliance All-Americans: Jennifer Hull- QB, Brittany Satterwhite - RB/WR, and Daniela Ottaiano - S. The Mustangs ended their first season with a roster of 52 players who put in an outstanding effort. The players ranged from 19 to 45 years of age and came from all types of different backgrounds.

The Mustangs team was originally owned and operated by Dallas - Fort Worth businesswoman LynMarie Liberty - Ellington. In 2010, she was named the WFA Owner of the Year. At the end of the 2011 season, LynMarie chose to allow the players and coaches to run the team, which will officially be player-owned in 2012.

Coaching staff

2012 Coaching Staff
Twyla Smith - Defensive Coordinator
Lacy Downs - Offensive Coordinator

2011 Coaching Staff
Mike "Duke" Ellington - Head Coach
Amanda Lemon - Defensive Coordinator & Linebackers Coach
Reginald Harvey - Offensive Coordinator & Backs/QB Coach"
Twyla Smith - Defensive Line CoachLacy Downs - Offensive Line CoachBrandice Mueller - Wide Receivers CoachBrontavius Davis - Defensive Backs CoachTerrance Brown - Special Teams CoachEric Luna - Offensive Line Assistant Coach2010 Coaching Staff
Mike "Duke" Ellington - Head Coach & Offensive Line CoachAmanda Lemon - Defensive Coordinator & Linebackers/DBs CoachScott Tribble - Offensive Coordinator & Backs/Receivers CoachTwyla Smith - Defensive Line CoachAndrea Bologna - Team Doctor''

League Recognition
Odessa Jenkins - 2010 WFA League MVP - 2010 WFA Championship Game MVP - 2010 1st Team All-American (RB) 
Alex Harvey - 2010 WFA American Conference Defensive MVP - 2010 1st Team All-American DT - 2009 1st Team All-American DT
Brittany Bushman - 2010 1st Team All-American (QB)
Stephanie "Freight Train" Wakefield - 2010 1st Team All-American (FB)
Melissa Beach - 2010 1st Team All-American (WR)
Yo Grant - 2010 1st Team All-American (TE)
Tamra Kelley - 2010 1st Team All-American (C)
Lorrie Newman - 2010 1st Team All-American (DE)
Jennifer Hull - 2010 1st Team All-American (LB) - 2009 Honorable Mention All-American (QB)
Etta Maytubby - 2010 2nd Team All-American (TE)
Brittany Satterwhite - 2009 Honorable Mention All-American (RB)
Daniela Ottaiano - 2009 Honorable Mention All-American (S)
Ebony Jones - 2009 1st Team All-American (DE)winner of the VH1 reality show I Want to Work for Diddy 2
Lyn Ellington - 2010 WFA Owner of the Year

2010 Championship Team Roster

Season-By-Season

|-
|2009 || 6 || 2 || 0 || 2nd American Southwest || --
|-
|2010 || 8 || 0 || 0 || 1st American Southwest || Won American Conference Quarterfinal (Pacific)Won American Conference Semifinal (Iowa)Won American Conference Championship (Las Vegas)Won WFA National Championship (Columbus)
|-
|2011 || 5 || 3 || 0 || 2nd American South Central || --
|-
|2012 || 6 || 2 || 0 || 2nd WFA American 12 || Won American Conference Wild Card (Arkansas)Lost American Conference Quarterfinal (Dallas)
|-
|Totals || 30 || 8 || 0 || --
|colspan="2"| (including playoffs)

2009

Season schedule

2010

Season schedule

** = Won by forfeit

2011

Standings

Season schedule

2012

Season schedule

External links
 Lone Star Mustangs official website
 Women's Football Alliance Official website

Women's Football Alliance teams
American football teams established in 2009
American football teams in the Dallas–Fort Worth metroplex
2009 establishments in Texas
Tarrant County, Texas
Women's sports in Texas